The Byzantine navy was the naval force of the East Roman or Byzantine Empire. Like the empire it served, it was a direct continuation from its Imperial Roman predecessor, but played a far greater role in the defence and survival of the state than its earlier iteration. While the fleets of the unified Roman Empire faced few great naval threats, operating as a policing force vastly inferior in power and prestige to the legions, the sea became vital to the very existence of the Byzantine state, which several historians have called a "maritime empire".

The first threat to Roman hegemony in the Mediterranean was posed by the Vandals in the 5th century, but their threat was ended by the wars of Justinian I in the 6th century. The re-establishment of a permanently maintained fleet and the introduction of the dromon galley in the same period also marks the point when the Byzantine navy began departing from its late Roman roots and developing its own characteristic identity. This process would be furthered with the onset of the Muslim conquests in the 7th century. Following the loss of the Levant and later Africa, the Mediterranean Sea was transformed from a "Roman lake" into a battleground between Byzantines and Arabs. In this struggle, the Byzantine fleets were critical, not only for the defence of the Empire's far-flung possessions around the Mediterranean basin, but also for repelling seaborne attacks against the imperial capital of Constantinople itself. Through the use of the newly invented "Greek fire", the Byzantine navy's best-known and feared secret weapon, Constantinople was saved from several sieges and numerous naval engagements were won for the Byzantines.

Progressively however it was split up into several regional (thematic) fleets, while a central Imperial Fleet was maintained at Constantinople, guarding the city and forming the core of naval expeditions. By the late 8th century, the Byzantine navy, a well-organized and maintained force, was again the dominant maritime power in the Mediterranean. The antagonism with the Muslim navies continued with alternating success, but in the 10th century, the Byzantines were able to recover a position of supremacy in the Eastern Mediterranean.

During the 11th century, the navy, like the Empire itself, began to decline. Faced with new naval challenges from the West, the Byzantines were increasingly forced to rely on the navies of Italian city-states like Venice and Genoa, with disastrous effects on Byzantium's economy and sovereignty. A period of recovery under the Komnenos dynasty was followed by another period of decline, which culminated in the disastrous dissolution of the Empire by the Fourth Crusade in 1204. After the Empire was restored in 1261, several emperors of the Palaiologan dynasty tried to revive the navy, but their efforts had only a temporary effect. Emperor Andronikos II even dissolved the navy completely, allowing the Venetians to defeat the Romans in two wars, the first of which resulting in a humiliating treaty that saw the Venetians keep multiple islands captured from the Romans during the war and forced the latter to repay the Venetians for the destruction of the Venetian Quarter in Constantinople at the hands of some of the Genoese residents of the city. By the mid-14th century, the Byzantine fleet, which once could put hundreds of warships to sea, was limited to a few dozen at best, and control of the Aegean passed definitively to the Italian and Ottoman navies. The diminished navy, however, continued to be active until the fall of the Byzantine Empire to the Ottomans in 1453.

Operational history

Early period

Civil wars and barbarian invasions: the 4th and 5th centuries

The Byzantine navy, like the Eastern Roman or Byzantine Empire itself, continued the systems of the Roman Empire. After the Battle of Actium in 31 BC, in the absence of any external threat in the Mediterranean, the Roman navy performed mostly policing and escort duties. Massive sea battles, like those fought centuries before in the Punic Wars (264 to 146 BC), no longer occurred, and the Roman fleets comprised relatively small vessels, best suited to their new tasks. By the early 4th century AD, the permanent Roman fleets had dwindled, so that when the fleets of the rival emperors Constantine the Great and Licinius clashed in 324 AD, they were composed to a great extent of newly built or -commandeered ships from the port cities of the Eastern Mediterranean. The civil wars of the 4th and early 5th centuries, however, did spur a revival of naval activity, with fleets mostly employed to transport armies. Considerable naval forces continued to be employed in the Western Mediterranean throughout the first quarter of the fifth century, especially from North Africa, but Rome's mastery of the Mediterranean was challenged when Africa was overrun by the Vandals (429 to 442).

The new Vandalic Kingdom of Carthage, under the capable Geiseric, immediately launched raids against the coasts of Italy and Greece, even sacking and plundering Rome in 455. The Vandal raids continued unabated over the next two decades, despite repeated Roman attempts to defeat them. The Western Empire was impotent, its navy having dwindled to almost nothing, but the eastern emperors could still call upon the resources and naval expertise of the eastern Mediterranean. A first Eastern expedition in 448, however, went no further than Sicily, and in 460, the Vandals attacked and destroyed a Western Roman invasion fleet at Cartagena in Spain. Finally, in 468, a huge Eastern expedition assembled under Basiliscus, reputedly numbering 1,113 ships and 100,000 men, but it failed disastrously. About 600 ships were lost to fire ships, and the financial cost of 130,000 pounds of gold and 700,000 pounds of silver nearly bankrupted the Empire. This forced the Romans to come to terms with Geiseric and to sign a peace treaty. After Geiseric's death in 477, however, the Vandal threat receded.

Sixth century – Justinian restores Roman control over the Mediterranean
The 6th century marked the rebirth of Roman naval power. In 508, as antagonism with the Ostrogothic Kingdom of Theodoric flared up, the Emperor Anastasius I is reported to have sent a fleet of 100 warships to raid the coasts of Italy. In 513, the general Vitalian revolted against Anastasius. The rebels assembled a fleet of 200 ships which, despite some initial successes, were destroyed by admiral Marinus, who employed a sulphur-based incendiary substance to defeat them.

In 533, taking advantage of the absence of the Vandal fleet, sent to suppress a revolt in Sardinia, an army of 15,000 under Belisarius was transported to Africa by an invasion fleet of 92 dromons and 500 transports, beginning the Vandalic War, the first of the wars of the reconquest of Emperor Justinian I. These were largely amphibious operations, made possible by the control of the Mediterranean waterways, and the fleet played a vital role in carrying supplies and reinforcements to the widely dispersed Byzantine expeditionary forces and garrisons. This fact was not lost on the Byzantines' enemies. Already in the 520s, Theodoric had planned to build a massive fleet directed against the Byzantines and the Vandals, but his death in 526 limited the extent to which these plans were realized. In 535, the Gothic War began with a double-pronged Byzantine offensive, with a fleet again carrying Belisarius' army to Sicily and then Italy, and another army invading Dalmatia. Byzantine control of the sea was of great strategic importance, allowing the smaller Byzantine army to successfully occupy the peninsula by 540.

In 541 however, the new Ostrogoth king, Totila, created a fleet of 400 warships with which to deny the seas around Italy to the Empire. Two Byzantine fleets were destroyed near Naples in 542, and in 546, Belisarius personally commanded 200 ships against the Gothic fleet that blockaded the mouths of the Tiber, in an unsuccessful effort to relieve Rome. In 550, Totila invaded Sicily, and over the next year, his 300-ship fleet captured Sardinia and Corsica, and raided Corfu and the coast of Epirus. However, a defeat in a sea battle off Sena Gallica marked the beginning of the final Imperial ascendancy. With the final conquest of Italy and southern Spain under Justinian, the Mediterranean once again became a "Roman lake".

Despite the subsequent loss of much of Italy to the Lombards, the Byzantines maintained control of the seas around the peninsula. As the Lombards rarely ventured to sea, the Byzantines were able to retain several coastal strips of Italian territory for centuries. The only major naval action of the next 80 years occurred during the siege of Constantinople by the Sassanid Persians, Avars and Slavs in 626.

Struggle against the Arabs

Emergence of the Arab naval threat

During the 640s, the Muslim conquest of Syria and Egypt created a new threat to Byzantium. Not only did the Arabs conquer significant recruiting and revenue-producing areas, but, after the utility of a strong navy was demonstrated by the short-lived Byzantine recapture of Alexandria in 644, they took to creating a navy of their own. In this effort the new Muslim elite, which came from the inland-oriented northern part of the Arabian peninsula, largely relied on the resources and manpower of the conquered Levant (especially the Copts of Egypt), which until a few years previously had provided ships and crews for the Byzantines. There is, however, evidence that in the new naval bases in Palestine shipwrights from Persia and Iraq were also employed. The lack of illustrations earlier than the 14th century means that nothing is known about the specifics of the early Muslim warships, although it is usually assumed that their naval efforts drew upon the existing Mediterranean maritime tradition. Given a largely shared nautical nomenclature, and the centuries-long interaction between the two cultures, Byzantine and Arab ships shared many similarities. This similarity also extended to tactics and general fleet organization; translations of Byzantine military manuals were available to the Arab admirals.

After seizing Cyprus in 649 and raiding Rhodes, Crete and Sicily, the young Arab navy decisively defeated the Byzantines under the personal command of Emperor Constans II (641–668) in the Battle of the Masts of 655. This catastrophic Byzantine defeat opened up the Mediterranean to the Arabs and began a centuries-long series of naval conflicts over the control of the Mediterranean waterways. From the reign of Muawiyah I (661–680), raids intensified, as preparations were made for a great assault on Constantinople itself. In the long first Arab siege of Constantinople, the Byzantine fleet proved instrumental to the survival of the Empire: the Arab fleets were defeated through the use of its newly developed secret weapon, known as "Greek fire". The Muslim advance in Asia Minor and the Aegean was halted, and an agreement to a thirty-year truce concluded soon after.

In the 680s, Justinian II paid attention to the needs of the navy, strengthening it by the resettlement of over 18,500 Mardaites along the southern coasts of the Empire, where they were employed as marines and rowers. Nevertheless, the Arab naval threat intensified as they gradually took control of North Africa in the 680s and 690s. The last Byzantine stronghold, Carthage, fell in 698, although a Byzantine naval expedition managed to briefly retake it. The Arab governor Musa bin Nusair built a new city and naval base at Tunis, and 1,000 Coptic shipwrights were brought to construct a new fleet, which would challenge Byzantine control of the western Mediterranean. Thus, from the early 8th century on, Muslim raids unfolded unceasingly against Byzantine holdings in the Western Mediterranean, especially Sicily. In addition, the new fleet would allow the Muslims to complete their conquest of the Maghreb and to successfully invade and capture most of the Visigoth-controlled Iberian Peninsula.

Byzantine counter-offensive

The Byzantines were unable to respond effectively to the Muslim advance in Africa because the two decades between 695 and 715 were a period of great domestic turmoil. They did react with raids of their own in the East, such as the one in 709 against Egypt which captured the local admiral, but they also were aware of a coming onslaught: as Caliph al-Walid I readied his forces for a renewed assault against Constantinople, Emperor Anastasios II prepared the capital, and mounted an unsuccessful pre-emptive strike against the Muslim naval preparations. Anastasios was soon overthrown by Theodosius III, who in turn was replaced, just as the Muslim army was advancing through Anatolia, by Leo III the Isaurian. It was Leo III who faced the second and final Arab siege of Constantinople. The use of Greek fire, which devastated the Arab fleet, was again instrumental in the Byzantine victory, while a harsh winter and Bulgar attacks further sapped the besiegers' strength.

In the aftermath of the siege, the retreating remains of the Arab fleet were decimated in a storm, and Byzantine forces launched a counter-offensive, with a fleet sacking Laodicea and an army driving the Arabs from Asia Minor. For the next three decades, naval warfare featured constant raids from both sides, with the Byzantines launching repeated attacks against the Muslim naval bases in Syria (Laodicea), and Egypt (Damietta and Tinnis). In 727, a revolt of the provincial thematic fleets, largely motivated by resentment against the Emperor's iconoclasm, was put down by the imperial fleet through the use of Greek fire. Despite the losses this entailed, some 390 warships were reportedly sent to attack Damietta in 739, and in 746 the Byzantines decisively defeated the Alexandrian fleet at Keramaia in Cyprus, breaking the naval power of the Umayyad Caliphate.

The Byzantines followed this up with the destruction of the North African flotillas and coupled their successes at sea with severe trading limitations imposed on Muslim traders. Given the Empire's new ability to control the waterways, this strangled Muslim maritime trade. With the collapse of the Umayyad state shortly thereafter and the increasing fragmentation of the Muslim world, the Byzantine navy was left as the sole organized naval force in the Mediterranean. Thus, during the latter half of the 8th century, the Byzantines enjoyed a second period of complete naval superiority. It is no coincidence that in the many Islamic apocalyptic texts composed and transmitted during the first and second Islamic centuries, the End Times are preceded by a seaborne Byzantine invasion.

These successes enabled Emperor Constantine V to shift the fleet from the Mediterranean to the Black Sea during his campaigns against the Bulgars in the 760s. In 763, a fleet of 800 ships carrying 9,600 cavalries and some infantry sailed to Anchialus, where he scored a significant victory, but in 766, a second fleet, allegedly of 2,600 ships, again bound for Anchialus, sank en route. At the same time, however, the Isaurian emperors undermined Byzantium's naval strength: with the Arab threat gone for the moment, and with the largely iconodule naval themes staunchly opposed to their iconoclastic policies, the emperors reduced the navy's size and downgraded the naval themes.

Renewed Muslim ascendancy

The Byzantine naval predominance lasted until the early 9th century when a succession of disasters at the hands of the resurgent Muslim fleets spelled its end and inaugurated an era that would represent the zenith of Muslim ascendancy. Already in 790, the Byzantines suffered a major defeat in the Gulf of Antalya, and raids against Cyprus and Crete recommenced during the reign of Harun al-Rashid (786–809). Around the Mediterranean, new powers were rising, foremost amongst them the Carolingian Empire, while in 803, the  recognized the de facto independence of Byzantine Venice, which was further entrenched by the repulsion of a Byzantine attack in 809. At the same time, in Ifriqiya, the new Aghlabid dynasty was established, which immediately engaged in raids throughout the central Mediterranean.

The Byzantines, on the other hand, were weakened by a series of catastrophic defeats against the Bulgars, followed in 820 by the Revolt of Thomas the Slav, which attracted the support of a large part of the Byzantine armed forces, including the thematic fleets. Despite its suppression, the revolt had severely depleted the Empire's defences. As a result, Crete fell between 824 and 827 to a band of Andalusian exiles. Three successive Byzantine recovery attempts failed over the next few years, and the island became a base for Muslim piratical activity in the Aegean, radically upsetting the balance of power in the region. Despite some Byzantine successes over the Cretan corsairs, and the razing of Damietta by a Byzantine fleet of 85 ships in 853, Arab naval power in the Levant was steadily reviving under Abbasid rule. Further Byzantine attempts to recover Crete, in 843 and 866, were complete failures.

The situation was even worse in the West. A critical blow was inflicted on the Empire in 827, as the Aghlabids began the slow conquest of Sicily, aided by the defection of the Byzantine commander Euphemios and the island's thematic fleet. In 838, the Muslims crossed over into Italy, taking Taranto and Brindisi, followed soon by Bari. Venetian operations against them were unsuccessful, and throughout the 840s, the Arabs were freely raiding Italy and the Adriatic, even attacking Rome in 846. Attacks by the Lombards and Lothair I failed to dislodge the Muslims from Italy, while two large-scale Byzantine attempts to recover Sicily were heavily defeated in 840 and 859. By 850, the Muslim fleets, together with large numbers of independent  raiders, had emerged as the major power of the Mediterranean, putting the Byzantines and the Christians in general on the defensive.

The same period, when a battered Byzantium defended itself against enemies on all fronts, also saw the emergence of a new, unexpected threat: the Rus' made their first appearance in Byzantine history with a raid against Paphlagonia in the 830s, followed by a major expedition in 860.

Byzantine Reconquest: the era of the Macedonian dynasty

During the course of the later 9th and the 10th century, as the Caliphate fractured into smaller states and Arab power became weakened, the Byzantines launched a series of successful campaigns against them. This "Byzantine Reconquest" was overseen by the able sovereigns of the Macedonian dynasty (867–1056), and marked the noontide of the Byzantine state.

Reign of Basil I

The ascension of Emperor Basil I (867–886) heralded this revival, as he embarked on an aggressive foreign policy. Continuing the policies of his predecessor, Michael III (842–867), he showed great care to the fleet, and as a result, successive victories followed. In 868, a fleet under the  Niketas Ooryphas relieved Ragusa from an Arab siege and re-established Byzantine presence in the area. A few years later, he twice heavily defeated the Cretan pirates at Kardia and in the Corinthian Gulf, temporarily securing the Aegean. Cyprus also was temporarily recovered and Bari occupied. At the same time, however, the Muslim presence in Cilicia was strengthened, and Tarsos became a major base for land and seaborne attacks against Byzantine territory, especially under the famed emir Yazaman al-Khadim (882–891), despite the heavy defeat of one of his raids before Euripos.

In the West, the Muslims continued to make steady advances, as the local Byzantine forces proved inadequate: the Empire was forced to rely on the aid of their nominal Italian subjects, and had to resort to the transfer of the eastern fleets to Italy to achieve any progress. Following the fall of Enna in 855, the Byzantines were confined to the eastern shore of Sicily, and under increasing pressure. A relief expedition in 868 achieved little. Syracuse was attacked again in 869, and in 870, Malta fell to the Aghlabids. Muslim corsairs raided the Adriatic, and although they were driven out of Apulia, in the early 880s they established bases along the western Italian coast, from where they would not be completely dislodged until 915. In 878, Syracuse, the main Byzantine stronghold in Sicily, was attacked again and fell, largely because the Imperial Fleet was occupied with transporting marble for the construction of the Nea Ekklesia, Basil's new church. In 880, Ooryphas' successor, the  Nasar, scored a significant victory in a night battle over the Aghlabids who were raiding the Ionian Islands. He then proceeded to raid Sicily, carrying off much booty, before defeating another Muslim fleet off Punta Stilo. At the same time, another Byzantine squadron scored a significant victory at Naples. These successes allowed a short-lived Byzantine counter-offensive to develop in the West in the 870s and 880s under Nikephoros Phokas the Elder, expanding the Byzantine foothold in Apulia and Calabria and forming the theme of Longobardia, which would later evolve into the Catepanate of Italy. A heavy defeat off Milazzo in 888, however, signalled the virtual disappearance of major Byzantine naval activity in the seas around Italy for the next century.

Arab raids during the reign of Leo VI

Despite the successes under Basil, during the reign of his successor Leo VI the Wise (886–912), the Empire again faced serious threats. In the north, a war broke out against the Bulgarian Tsar Simeon, and a part of the Imperial Fleet was used in 895 to ferry an army of Magyars across the Danube to raid Bulgaria. The Bulgarian war produced several costly defeats, while at the same time the Arab naval threat reached new heights, with successive raids devastating the shores of Byzantium's naval heartland, the Aegean Sea. In 891 or 893, the Arab fleet sacked the island of Samos and took its  (military governor) prisoner, and in 898, the eunuch admiral Raghib carried off 3,000 Byzantine sailors of the Cibyrrhaeots as prisoners. These losses denuded Byzantine defences, opening the Aegean up to raids by the Syrian fleets. The first heavy blow came in 901, when the renegade Damian of Tarsus plundered Demetrias, while in the next year, Taormina, the Empire's last outpost in Sicily, fell to the Muslims. The greatest disaster, however, came in 904, when another renegade, Leo of Tripoli, raided the Aegean. His fleet penetrated even into the Dardanelles, before proceeding to sack the Empire's second city, Thessalonica, all while the Empire's fleet remained passive in the face of the Arabs' superior numbers. Furthermore, the Cretan corsairs' raids reached such intensity, that by the end of Leo's reign, most of the southern Aegean islands were either abandoned or forced to accept Muslim control and pay tribute to the pirates. It is no surprise that a defensive and cautious mindset was prevalent in Leo's contemporary instructions on naval warfare (Naumachica).

Appointed admiral in 904, he was unable to prevent the sack of Thessalonica, but he scored the first victory in 905 or 906, and in 910, he led a successful attack on Laodicea. The city was sacked and its hinterland plundered and ravaged without the loss of any ships. A year later, however, a huge expedition of 112 dromons and 75  with 43,000 men, that had sailed under Himerios against the Emirate of Crete, not only failed to recover the island, but on its return voyage, it was ambushed and comprehensively defeated by Leo of Tripoli off Chios (October 912).

The tide began to turn again after 920. Coincidentally, the same year witnessed the ascension of an admiral, Romanos Lekapenos (920–944), to the imperial throne, for the second (after Tiberios Apsimaros) and last time in the Empire's history. Finally, in 923, the decisive defeat of Leo of Tripoli off Lemnos, coupled with the death of Damian during a siege of a Byzantine fortress in the next year, marked the beginning of the Byzantine resurgence.

Recovery of Crete and the northern Levant

The Empire's growing might be displayed in 942, when Emperor Romanos I dispatched a squadron to the Tyrrhenian Sea. Using Greek fire, the squadron destroyed a fleet of Muslim corsairs from Fraxinetum. In 949, however, another expedition of about 100 ships, launched by Constantine VII (945–959) against the Emirate of Crete, ended in disaster, due to the incompetence of its commander, Constantine Gongyles. A renewed offensive in Italy in 951–952 was defeated by the Fatimids, but another expedition in 956 and the loss of an Ifriqiyan fleet in a storm in 958 temporarily stabilized the situation in the peninsula. In 962, the Fatimids launched an assault on the remaining Byzantine strongholds on Sicily; Taormina fell on Christmas Day 962 and Rometta was besieged. In response, a major Byzantine expedition was launched in 964 but ended in disaster. The Fatimids defeated the Byzantine army before Rametta and then annihilated the fleet at the Battle of the Straits, notably through the use of divers bearing incendiary devices. Both powers focusing their attention elsewhere, a truce was concluded between Byzantium and the Fatimids in 967, which curbed Byzantine naval activity in the West: the seas of Italy were left to the local Byzantine forces and the various Italian states until after 1025, when Byzantium again actively intervened in southern Italy and Sicily.

In the East, in 956 the  Basil Hexamilites inflicted a crushing defeat on the Tarsiot fleet, opening the way for another grand expedition to recover Crete. It was entrusted to Nikephoros Phokas, who in 960 set out with a fleet of 100 dromons, 200 , and 308 transports, carrying an overall force of 77,000 men, to subdue the island. Although the navy ultimately had a limited combat role in the campaign, it was essential for keeping the sea-lanes open after a disastrous attack into the interior of the island required supplies to be brought in by sea. The conquest of Crete removed the direct threat to the Aegean, Byzantium's naval heartland, while Phokas' subsequent operations led to the recovery of Cilicia (in 963), Cyprus (in 968), and the northern Syrian coast (in 969). These conquests removed the threat of the once mighty Muslim Syrian fleets, effectively re-establishing Byzantine dominance in the Eastern Mediterranean so that Nikephoros Phokas could boast to Liutprand of Cremona with the words "I alone command the sea". A few raids and naval clashes occurred as antagonism with the Fatimids mounted in the late 990s, but peaceful relations were restored soon after, and the Eastern Mediterranean remained relatively calm for several decades to come.

During the same period, the Byzantine fleet was active in the Black Sea as well: a Rus' fleet that was threatening Constantinople in 941 was destroyed by 15 hastily assembled old ships equipped with Greek fire, and the navy played an important role in the Rus'–Byzantine War of 970–971, when John I Tzimiskes (969–976) sent 300 ships to blockade the Kievan Rus' from retreating over the Danube.

Komnenian period

Decline during the 11th century

Throughout most of the 11th century, the Byzantine navy faced few challenges. The Muslim threat had receded, as their navies declined and relations between the Fatimids, especially, and the Empire were largely peaceful. The last Arab raid against imperial territory was recorded in 1035 in the Cyclades, and was defeated in the next year. Another Rus' attack in 1043 was beaten back with ease, and with the exception of a short-lived attempt to recover Sicily under George Maniakes, no major naval expeditions were undertaken either. Inevitably, this long period of peace and prosperity led to complacency and neglect of the military. Already in the reign of Basil II (976–1025), the defence of the Adriatic was entrusted to the Venetians. Under Constantine IX (1042–1055), both the army and navy were reduced as military service was increasingly commuted in favour of cash payments, resulting in an increased dependency upon foreign mercenaries. The large thematic fleets declined and were replaced by small squadrons subject to the local military commanders, geared more towards the suppression of piracy than towards confronting a major maritime foe.

By the last quarter of the 11th century, the Byzantine navy was a shadow of its former self, having declined through neglect, the incompetence of its officers, and lack of funds. Kekaumenos, writing in c. 1078, laments that "on the pretext of reasonable patrols, [the Byzantine ships] are doing nothing else but ferrying wheat, barley, pulse, cheese, wine, meat, olive oil, a great deal of money, and anything else" from the islands and coasts of the Aegean, while they "flee [the enemy] before they have even caught sight of them, and thus become an embarrassment to the Romans". By the time Kekaumenos wrote, new and powerful adversaries had risen. In the West, the Norman Kingdom of Sicily, which had expelled the Byzantines from Southern Italy and had conquered Sicily, was now casting its eye on the Byzantine Adriatic coasts and beyond. In the East, the disastrous Battle of Manzikert in 1071 had resulted in the loss of Asia Minor, the Empire's military and economic heartland, to the Seljuk Turks, who by 1081 had established their capital at Nicaea, barely a hundred miles south of Constantinople. Soon after, Turkish as well as Christian pirates appeared in the Aegean. The Byzantine thematic fleets, which once policed the seas, were by then so depleted by neglect and the successive civil wars that they were incapable of responding effectively.

Attempts at recovery under Alexios I and John II
At this point, the sorry state of the Byzantine fleet had dire consequences. The Norman invasion could not be forestalled, and their army seized Corfu, landed unopposed in Epirus and laid siege to Dyrrhachium, starting a decade of war which consumed the scant resources of the embattled Empire. The new emperor, Alexios I Komnenos (1081–1118), was forced to call upon the assistance of the Venetians, who in the 1070s had already asserted their control of the Adriatic and Dalmatia against the Normans. In 1082, in exchange for their help, he granted them major trading concessions. This treaty, and subsequent extensions of these privileges, practically rendered the Byzantines hostage to the Venetians (and later also the Genoese and the Pisans). Historian John Birkenmeier notes that:

In the clashes with the Normans through the 1080s, the only effective Byzantine naval force was a squadron commanded, and possibly maintained, by Michael Maurex, a veteran naval commander of previous decades. Together with the Venetians, he initially prevailed over the Norman fleet, but the joint fleet was caught off guard and defeated by the Normans off Corfu in 1084.

Alexios inevitably realized the importance of having his own fleet, and despite his preoccupation with land operations, he took steps to re-establish the navy's strength. His efforts bore some success, especially in countering the attempts by Turkish emirs like Tzachas of Smyrna to launch fleets in the Aegean. The fleet under John Doukas was subsequently used to suppress revolts in Crete and Cyprus. With the aid of the Crusaders, Alexios was able to regain the coasts of Western Anatolia and expand his influence eastwards: in 1104, a Byzantine squadron of 10 ships captured Laodicea and other coastal towns as far as Tripoli. By 1118, Alexios was able to pass on a small navy to his successor, John II Komnenos (1118–1143). Like his father, John II concentrated on the army and regular land-based campaigns, but he took care to maintain the navy's strength and provisioning system. In 1122, however, John refused to renew the trading privileges that Alexios had granted to the Venetians. In retaliation, the Venetians plundered several Byzantine islands, and, with the Byzantine fleet unable to confront them, John was forced to renew the treaty in 1125. Evidently, the Byzantine navy at this point was not sufficiently powerful for John to successfully confront Venice, especially since there were other pressing demands on the Empire's resources. Not long after this incident, John II, acting on the advice of his finance minister John of Poutza, is reported to have cut funding to the fleet and transferred it to the army, equipping ships on an ad hoc basis only.

Naval expeditions of Manuel I
The navy enjoyed a major comeback under the ambitious emperor Manuel I Komnenos (1143–1180), who used it extensively as a powerful tool of foreign policy in his relations with the Latin and Muslim states of the Eastern Mediterranean. During the early years of his reign, the Byzantine naval forces were still weak: in 1147, the fleet of Roger II of Sicily under George of Antioch was able to raid Corfu, the Ionian islands and into the Aegean almost unopposed. In the next year, with Venetian aid, an army accompanied by a very large fleet (allegedly 500 warships and 1,000 transports) was sent to recapture Corfu and the Ionian Islands from the Normans. In retaliation, a Norman fleet of 40 ships reached Constantinople itself, demonstrating in the Bosporus off the Great Palace and raiding its suburbs. On its return voyage however it was attacked and destroyed by a Byzantine or Venetian fleet.

In 1155, a Byzantine squadron of 10 ships in support of Norman rebel Robert III of Loritello arrived at Ancona, launching the last Byzantine bid to regain Southern Italy. Despite initial successes and reinforcements under  Alexios Komnenos Bryennios, the expedition was ultimately defeated in 1156, and 4 Byzantine ships were captured. By 1169, the efforts of Manuel had evidently borne fruit, as a large and purely Byzantine fleet of about 150 galleys, 10-12 large transports and 60 horse transports under  Andronikos Kontostephanos was sent to invade Egypt in cooperation with the ruler of the Crusader Kingdom of Jerusalem. The invasion failed, however, and the Byzantines lost half the fleet in a storm on the way back.

Following the Empire-wide seizure and imprisonment of all Venetians in March 1171, the Byzantine fleet was strong enough to deter an outright attack by the Venetians, who sailed to Chios and settled for negotiations. Manuel sent a fleet of 150 ships under Kontostephanos to confront them there and employed delaying tactics, until, weakened by disease, the Venetians began to withdraw and were pursued by Kontostephanos' fleet. It was a remarkable reversal of fortunes, compared with the humiliation of 1125. In 1177, another fleet of 70 galleys and 80 auxiliary ships under Kontostephanos, destined for Egypt, returned home after appearing off Acre, as Count Philip of Flanders and many important nobles of the Kingdom of Jerusalem refused to participate in the campaign. However, by the end of Manuel's reign, the strains of constant warfare on all fronts and the Emperor's various grandiose projects had become evident: the historian Niketas Choniates attributes the rise of piracy in the latter years of Manuel's reign to the diversion of the funds intended for the maintenance of the fleet for other needs of the imperial treasury.

Decline

Angelos dynasty and the Fourth Crusade

After the death of Manuel I and the subsequent demise of the Komnenian dynasty in 1185, the navy declined swiftly. The maintenance of galleys and the upkeep of proficient crews were very expensive, and neglect led to a rapid deterioration of the fleet. Already by 1182 the Byzantines had to pay Venetian mercenaries to crew some of their galleys, but in the 1180s, as the bulk of the Komnenian naval establishment persisted, expeditions of 70–100 ships are still recorded in contemporary sources. Thus Emperor Andronikos I Komnenos (1183–1185) could still gather 100 warships in 1185 to resist and later defeat a Norman fleet in the Sea of Marmara. However, the subsequent peace treaty included a clause that required the Normans to furnish a fleet for the Empire. This, together with a similar agreement made by Isaac II Angelos (1185–1195 and 1203–1204) with Venice the next year, in which the Republic would provide 40–100 galleys at six months' notice in exchange for favourable trading concessions, is a telling indication that the Byzantine government was aware of the inadequacy of its own naval establishment.

The period also saw the rise of piracy across the Eastern Mediterranean. The pirate activity was high in the Aegean, while pirate captains frequently offering themselves as mercenaries to one or the other of the region's powers, providing for the latter a quick and cheap way of raising a fleet for particular expeditions, without the costs of a standing navy. Thus a Byzantine fleet of 66 vessels sent by Isaac II to recapture Cyprus from Isaac Komnenos was destroyed by the pirate Margaritus of Brindisi, who was in the employ of the Normans of Sicily. The depredations of the pirates, especially the Genoese captain Kaphoures, described by Niketas Choniates and his brother, the Metropolitan of Athens Michael Choniates, finally forced the Angeloi to action. The fleet tax was once again levied from the coastal regions and a navy of 30 ships was equipped, which was entrusted to the Calabrian pirate Steiriones. Despite scoring a few early successes, Steiriones' fleet was destroyed in a surprise attack by Kaphoures off Sestos. A second fleet, augmented by Pisan vessels and again commanded by Steiriones, was finally able to defeat Kaphoures and end his raids.

At the same time, however, the then , Michael Stryphnos, was accused by Niketas Choniates of enriching himself by selling off the equipment of the imperial fleet, while by the early 13th century the authority of the central government had weakened to such an extent that various local potentates began seizing power in the provinces. The general atmosphere was one of lawlessness, which enabled men like Leo Sgouros in southern Greece and the imperial governor of Samos, Pegonites, to use their ships for their own purposes, launching raids of their own. Even Emperor Alexios III Angelos (1195–1203) is said to have licensed one of his commanders, Constantine Phrangopoulos, to launch pirate raids against commerce in the Black Sea.

The Byzantine state and its fleet were thus in no state to resist the naval might of Venice, which supported the Fourth Crusade. When Alexios III and Stryphnos were alerted to the fact that the Crusade was sailing for Constantinople, only 20 "wretched and decayed" vessels could be found, according to Niketas Choniates. During the first Crusader siege of the city in 1203, the attempts of the Byzantine ships to oppose the Crusader fleet from entering the Golden Horn were repulsed, and the Byzantine attempt to employ fireships failed due to the Venetians' skill at handling their ships.

Nicaea and the Palaiologan period

After the capture of Constantinople by the Fourth Crusade in 1204, the Byzantine Empire was partitioned between the Crusaders, while three Greek successor states were set up, the Despotate of Epirus, the Empire of Trebizond, and the Empire of Nicaea, each claiming the Byzantine imperial title. The former did not maintain a fleet, the Trapezuntine navy was minuscule and mostly used for patrols and transporting troops, while the Nicaeans initially followed a policy of consolidation and used their fleet for coastal defence. Under John III Vatatzes (1222–1254), a more energetic foreign policy was pursued, and in 1225, the Nicaean fleet was able to occupy the islands of Lesbos, Chios, Samos, and Icaria. It was, however, no match for the Venetians: attempting to blockade Constantinople in 1235, the Nicaean navy was defeated by a far smaller Venetian force, and in another similar attempt in 1241, the Nicaeans were again routed. Nicaean efforts during the 1230s to support a local rebellion in Crete against Venice were also only partially successful, with the last Nicaean troops being forced to leave the island in 1236. Aware of the weakness of his navy, in March 1261 the Emperor Michael VIII Palaiologos (1259–1282) concluded the Treaty of Nymphaeum with the Genoese, securing their aid against Venice at sea, in return for commercial privileges.

Following the recapture of Constantinople a few months later however, Michael VIII was able to focus his attention on building up his own fleet. In the early 1260s, the Byzantine navy was still weak and depended still greatly on Genoese aid. Even so, the allies were not able to stand up to Venice in a direct confrontation, as evidenced by the defeat of a combined Byzantine–Genoese fleet of 48 ships by a much smaller Venetian fleet in 1263. Taking advantage of the Italians' preoccupation with the ongoing Venetian–Genoese war, by 1270 Michael's efforts had produced a strong navy of 80 ships, with several Latin privateers sailing under imperial colours. In the same year, a fleet of 24 galleys besieged the town of Oreos in Negroponte (Euboea), and defeated a Latin fleet of 20 galleys. This marked the first successful independent Byzantine naval operation and the beginning of an organized naval campaign in the Aegean that would continue throughout the 1270s and would result in the recapture, albeit briefly, of many islands from the Latins.

This revival did not last long. Following the death of Charles of Anjou in 1285 and the end of the threat of an invasion from Italy, Michael's successor Andronikos II Palaiologos (1282–1328) assumed that, by relying on the naval strength of his Genoese allies, he could do without the maintenance of a fleet, whose particularly heavy expenditure the increasingly cash-strapped treasury could no longer afford. At the same time, Andronikos was less concerned with the West and more with affairs in Asia Minor and his—eventually futile—attempt to stop the Turkish advance there, a policy where the fleet lacked a role. Consequently, the entire fleet was disbanded, its crews dismissed and the ships are broken up or left to rot. The results were quick to follow: during Andronikos' long reign, the Turks gradually took permanent possession of the Aegean coasts of Anatolia, with the Empire unable to reverse the situation, while the Venetian fleet was able to attack Constantinople and raid its suburbs at will during the 1296–1302 war.

Andronikos' decision aroused considerable opposition and criticism from contemporary scholars and officials almost from the outset, and historians like Pachymeres and Nikephoros Gregoras dwell long on the disastrous long-term effects of this short-sighted decision: piracy flourished, often augmented by the crews of the disbanded fleet who took service under Turkish and Latin masters, Constantinople was rendered defenceless towards the Italian maritime powers, and more and more Aegean islands fell under foreign rule—including Chios to the Genoese Benedetto Zaccaria, Rhodes and the Dodecanese to the Hospitallers, Lesbos and other islands to the Gattilusi. As Gregoras commented, "if [the Byzantines] had remained masters of the seas, as they had been, then the Latins would not have grown so arrogant [...], nor would the Turks ever have gazed upon the sands of the [Aegean] sea, [...] nor would we have to pay to everyone tribute every year." After 1305, bowing to popular pressure and the need to contain the Catalan Company, the Emperor belatedly tried to rebuild the navy of 20 vessels, but although a few ships were built and a small fleet appears to have been active over the next couple of years, it eventually was disbanded again.

In the 14th century, recurrent civil wars, attacks from Bulgaria and Serbia in the Balkans and the devastation caused by ever-increasing Turkish raids hastened the collapse of the Byzantine state, which would culminate in its final fall to the Ottoman Turks in 1453. Several emperors after Andronikos II also tried to re-build a fleet, especially in order to secure the security and hence the independence of Constantinople itself from the interference of the Italian maritime powers, but their efforts produced only short-term results.

Thus Andronikos II's successor Andronikos III Palaiologos (1328–1341), immediately after his accession, with the help of contributions from various magnates, assembled a large fleet of reportedly 105 vessels. This he personally led in the last major foray of a Byzantine navy in the Aegean, recovering Chios and Phocaea from the Genoese and forcing various smaller Latin and Turkish principalities to come to terms with him. His campaigns against the Ottomans in Bithynia were failures, however, and soon the Ottomans had established their first naval base at Trigleia on the Sea of Marmara, from where they raided the coasts of Thrace. This fleet was very active during the civil war of 1341–1347, in which its commander played a prominent role. Following the civil war, Emperor John VI Kantakouzenos (1347–1354) tried to restore the navy and merchant fleet, as a means of both reducing the Empire's economic dependency on the Genoese colony of Galata, which controlled the trade passing through Constantinople, and of securing the control of the Dardanelles against passage by the Turks. To that end, he enlisted the aid of the Venetians, but in March 1349, his newly built fleet of nine warships and about 100 smaller vessels were caught in a storm off the southern shore of Constantinople. The inexperienced crews panicked, and the ships were either sunk or captured by the Genoese. Undeterred, Kantakouzenos launched another effort at building a fleet, which allowed him to re-establish Byzantine authority over Thessalonica and some coastal cities and islands. A core of this fleet was maintained at Constantinople, and although Byzantine ships remained active in the Aegean, and scored some successes over Turkish pirates, they were never able to stop their activities, let alone challenge the Italian navies for supremacy at sea. Lack of funds condemned the fleet to a mere handful of vessels maintained at Constantinople. It is characteristic that in his 1418 pamphlet to the  Theodore II Palaiologos, the scholar Gemistos Plethon advises against the maintenance of a navy, on the grounds that resources were insufficient to adequately maintain both it and an effective army.

Henceforth, the impoverished Byzantine state became a pawn of the great powers of the day, trying to survive by exploiting their rivalries. Thus, for instance, in 1351, Kantakouzenos was induced to side with Venice in its war with Genoa, but, abandoned by the Venetian admirals, his fleet was easily defeated by the Genoese and he was forced to sign an unfavourable peace. During the brief usurpation of John VII in 1390, Manuel II (1391–1425) was able to gather only five galleys and four smaller vessels (including some from the Hospitallers of Rhodes) to recapture Constantinople and rescue his father John V. Six years later, Manuel promised to arm ten ships to assist the Crusade of Nicopolis; twenty years later, he personally commanded 4 galleys and 2 other vessels carrying some infantry and cavalry, and saved the island of Thasos from an invasion. Byzantine ships were active throughout the Ottoman Interregnum, when Byzantium sided with various rival Ottoman princes in turn. Manuel used his ships to ferry the rival pretenders and their forces across the Straits. With Genoese assistance, Manuel's fleet was also able to muster a fleet of eight galleys and capture Gallipoli in May 1410, albeit for a brief time; and in August 1411, the Byzantine fleet was instrumental in the failure of a siege of Constantinople by the Ottoman prince Musa Çelebi, when it defeated Musa's attempt to blockade the city by sea as well. Likewise, in 1421, 10 Byzantine warships were engaged in support of the Ottoman pretender Mustafa against Sultan Murad II.

The last recorded Byzantine naval victory occurred in 1427 in a battle off the Echinades Islands, when the Emperor John VIII Palaiologos (1425–1448) defeated the superior fleet of Carlo I Tocco, Count of Cephalonia and Despot of Epirus, forcing him to relinquish all his holdings in the Morea to the Byzantines. The last appearance of the Byzantine navy was in the final Ottoman siege of 1453, when a mixed fleet of Byzantine, Genoese and Venetian ships (varying numbers are provided by the sources, ranging from 10 to 39 vessels) defended Constantinople against the Ottoman fleet. During the siege, on 20 April 1453, the last naval engagement in Byzantine history took place when three Genoese galleys escorting a Byzantine transport fought their way through the huge Ottoman blockade fleet and into the Golden Horn.

Organization

Early period (4th – mid-7th centuries)
Very little is known about the organization of the Roman fleets of late Antiquity, from the gradual break-up of the large provincial fleets into smaller squadrons in the 3rd century to the formation of a new navy at the onset of the Muslim conquests. Despite the evidence of considerable naval activity in this period, earlier scholars believed that the Roman navy had all but vanished by the 4th century, but more recent work has altered this picture towards a transformation into a mainly fluvial and coastal force, designed for close co-operation with the army.

Under Emperor Diocletian (284–305), the navy's strength reportedly increased from 46,000 men to 64,000 men, a figure that represents the numerical peak of the late Roman navy. The Danube Fleet (Classis Histrica) with its attendant legionary flotillas is still well attested in the Notitia Dignitatum, and its increased activity is commented upon by Vegetius (De Re Militari, IV.46). In the West, several fluvial fleets are mentioned, but the old standing praetorian fleets had all but vanished (De Re Militari, IV.31) and even the remaining western provincial fleets appear to have been seriously understrength and incapable of countering any significant barbarian attack. In the East, the Syrian and Alexandrian fleets are known from legal sources to have still existed in c. 400 (Codex Justinianus, XI.2.4 & XI.13.1), while a fleet is known to have been stationed at Constantinople itself, perhaps created out of the remnants of the praetorian fleets. In 400 it was sufficient to slaughter a large number of Goths who had built rafts and tried to cross the strip of sea that separates Asia from Europe. Its size, however, is unknown, and it does not appear in the Notitia.

For operations in the Mediterranean during the 5th century, fleets appear to have been assembled on an ad hoc basis and then disbanded. The first permanent Byzantine fleet can be traced to the early 6th century and the revolt of Vitalian in 513–515, when Anastasius I created a fleet to counter the rebels' own. This fleet was retained and under Justinian I and his successors it was developed into a professional and well-maintained force. Because of the absence of any naval threat, however, the navy of the late 6th century was relatively small, with several small flotillas in the Danube and two main fleets maintained at Ravenna and Constantinople. Additional flotillas must have been stationed at the other great maritime and commercial centres of the Empire: at Alexandria, providing the escort to the annual grain fleet to Constantinople, and at Carthage, controlling the western Mediterranean. Justinian also stationed troops and ships at the more remote outposts of the Empire, at Septem (Ceuta), Cherson in the Crimea, and Aelana (Eilat) in the Gulf of Aqaba. The long-established naval tradition and infrastructure of those areas made the maintenance of the fleet easier, and, in the event of a naval expedition, a large fleet could be quickly and inexpensively assembled by impressing the numerous merchant vessels.

Middle period (late 7th century – 1070s)

Fleet organization

In response to the Arab conquests during the 7th century, the whole administrative and military system of the Empire was reformed, and the thematic system established. According to this, the Empire was divided into several themes (sing.), which were regional civil and military administrations.

Rise and fall of the 
A similar process was followed in the fleet, which was organized along similar lines. The exact date is unknown, with suggestions ranging from the 650s/660s, in response to the Battle of the Masts, or following the first Arab siege of Constantinople in 672–678. Its origin is also unknown: it was recruited possibly from the remainders of the old , or the army of the Illyricum. As its name suggests, it comprised most of the Empire's standing navy, and faced the principal maritime threat, the Arab fleets of Egypt and Syria.

The  however proved inadequate and were replaced in the early 8th century by a more complex system composed of three elements, which with minor alterations survived until the 11th century: a central imperial fleet based at Constantinople, a small number of large regional naval commands, either naval themes or independent commands termed "droungariates", and a greater number of local squadrons charged with purely defensive and police tasks and subordinate to the local provincial governors. Unlike the earlier Roman navy, where the provincial fleets were decidedly inferior in numbers and included only lighter vessels than the central fleets, the Byzantine regional fleets were probably formidable formations in their own right.

The Imperial Fleet
The capital's navy had played a central role in the repulsion of the Arab sieges of Constantinople, but the exact date of the establishment of the Imperial Fleet (or) as a distinct command is unclear. The Irish historian J. B. Bury, followed by the French Byzantinist Rodolphe Guilland, considered it "not improbable" that the Imperial Fleet existed as a subordinate command under the  already in the 7th century. From that point on, the Imperial Fleet formed the main naval reserve force and provided the core of various expeditionary fleets.

Maritime themes
The first and for a long time only maritime theme was the Theme of the Cibyrrhaeots. It was created from the  fleet, and assigned to the administration and defence of the southern coasts of Asia Minor. The exact date of its creation is unclear, with one view proposing  and another . Its , first mentioned in 734, was based at Attaleia. Being located closest to the Muslim Levant, it remained the Empire's principal naval fleet for centuries, until it was reduced with the decline of the Arab naval threat. The fleet is last mentioned in 1043, and thereafter the theme became a purely civilian province.

Unlike the other , who headed subordinate commands, these two circumscriptions were completely independent, and their  exercised both civil and military authority over them. It comprised it the Ionian coast, and its capital was at Smyrna.

Local squadrons
They played an intermediate role between the large thematic fleets and the central Imperial Fleet: they were permanent squadrons with professional crews, maintained by resources from the imperial treasury and not the province they were stationed in, but subordinate to the local thematic  and charged mainly with local defence and police duties. These were:
Justinian settled 6,500 Mardaites there, who provided oarsmen and garrisons. While not exclusively a naval theme, it maintained its own fleet. It was split in 809 into the Theme of the Peloponnese and the new Theme of Hellas, covering Central Greece and Thessaly, which also retained smaller fleets.
 The Theme of Sicily was responsible for Sicily and the imperial possessions in south-western Italy (Calabria). Once the bastion of Byzantine naval strength in the West, by the late 9th century it had greatly diminished in strength and disappeared after the final loss of Taormina in 902. Distinct  are attested for Sicily proper and Calabria.
 The Theme of Cephallenia, controlling the Ionian Islands, was established in the mid- to late 8th century, to protect imperial communications with Italy and defend the Ionian Sea from Arab raids. The new imperial possessions in Apulia were added to it in the 870s, before they were made into a separate theme (that of Longobardia) in about 910.

Such  are known for Chios, Malta, the Euboic Gulf, and possibly Vagenetia and "Bulgaria" (whose area of control is identified by Ahrweiler with the mouths of the Danube). These vanished by the end of the 9th century, either succumbing to Arab attacks or being reformed or incorporated into themes.

Manpower and size
Just as with its land counterpart, the exact size of the Byzantine navy and its units is a matter of considerable debate, owing to the scantness and ambiguous nature of the primary sources. One exceptions are the numbers for the late 9th and early 10th century, for which we possess a more detailed breakdown, dated to the Cretan expedition of 911. These lists reveal that during the reign of Leo VI the Wise, the navy reached 34,200 oarsmen and perhaps as many as 8,000 marines. These four thousand marines were professional soldiers, first recruited as a corps by Basil I in the 870s. They were a great asset to the Imperial Fleet, for whereas previously it had depended on thematic and tagmatic soldiers for its marines, the new force provided a more reliable, better trained and immediately available force at the Emperor's disposal. The high status of these marines is illustrated by the fact that they were considered to belong to the imperial , and were organized along similar lines. The Aegean thematic fleet numbered 2,610 oarsmen and 400 marines, the Cibyrrhaeot fleet stood at 5,710 oarsmen and 1,000 marines, the Samian fleet at 3,980 oarsmen and 600 marines, and finally, the Theme of Hellas furnished 2,300 oarsmen with a portion of its 2,000 thematic soldiers doubling as marines.

The following table contains estimates, by Warren T. Treadgold, of the number of oarsmen over the entire history of the Byzantine navy:

Contrary to popular perception, galley slaves were not used as oarsmen, either by the Byzantines or the Arabs, or by their Roman and Greek predecessors. Throughout the existence of the Empire, Byzantine crews consisted of mostly lower-class freeborn men, who were professional soldiers, legally obliged to perform military service in return for pay or land estates. Use was however made of prisoners of war and foreigners as well.

In his De Ceremoniis, Constantine Porphyrogennetos gives the fleet lists for the expeditions against Crete of 911 and 949. These references have sparked a considerable debate as to their interpretation: thus the numbers given for the entire Imperial Fleet in 949 can be interpreted as either 100, 150 or 250 ships, depending on the reading of the Greek text. The precise meaning of the term  is also a subject of confusion: traditionally, it is held to have been a standard complement of 108 men, and that more than one could be present aboard a single ship. In the context of the De Ceremoniis however, it can also be read simply as "unit" or "ship". The number of 150 seems more compatible with the numbers recorded elsewhere, and is accepted by most scholars, although they differ as to the composition of the fleet. Makrypoulias interprets the number as 8 , 100  and 42  proper, the latter including the two imperial vessels and the ten ships of the  squadron. As for the total size of the Byzantine navy in this period, Warren Treadgold extrapolates a total, including the naval themes, of  warships, a number which was increased to 307 for the Cretan expedition of 960–961. According to Treadgold, the latter number probably represents the approximate standing strength of the entire Byzantine navy (including the smaller flotillas) in the 9th and 10th centuries. It is however noteworthy that a significant drop in the numbers of ships and men attached to the thematic fleets is evident between 911 and 949. This drop, which reduced the size of thematic fleets from a third to a quarter of the total navy, was partly due to the increased use of the lighter  type instead of the heavier  proper, and partly due to financial and manpower difficulties. It is also indicative of a general trend that would lead to the complete disappearance of the provincial fleets by the late 11th century.

Rank structure
Although naval themes were organized much the same way as their land counterparts, there is some confusion in the Byzantine sources as to the exact rank structure. , corresponding to 'rear admiral').

His title is still found in the Komnenian era, albeit as commander of the imperial escort squadron, and survived until the Palaiologan era, being listed in the 14th-century Book of Offices of Pseudo-Kodinos. The office of a deputy called  is also mentioned for the Imperial Fleet, but his role is unclear from the sources. He may have held a post similar to that of a port admiral. Although some of these senior officers were professional seamen, having risen from the ranks, most fleet commanders were high court officials, who would have relied on their more experienced professional subordinates for nautical expertise.

Each ship's crew, depending on its size, was composed of one to three . The  were helmsmen, in charge of the steering oars in the stern, as well as of the rowers on either side of the ship. The senior of the two was the "first . In actual terms, there probably were several of each kind of officer upon each ship, working in shifts. Most of these officers rose from the ranks, and there are references in the De Administrando Imperio to first oarsmen who rose to become  in the imperial barges, and later assumed still higher offices; Emperor Romanos Lekapenos being the most successful example. A  (trumpeter) is also recorded in the sources, who conveyed orders to the rowers ( or ). Since the marine infantry were organized as regular army units, their ranks followed those of the army.

Late period (1080s–1453)

Reforms of the Komnenoi
After the decline of the navy in the 11th century, Alexios I rebuilt it on different lines. The , once the overall naval commander, was subordinated to him, acting now as his principal aide. The  was also appointed as overall governor of southern Greece, the old themes of Hellas and the Peloponnese, which were divided into districts that supplied the fleet. Under John II, the Aegean islands also became responsible for the maintenance, crewing and provision of warships, and contemporary sources took pride in the fact that the great fleets of Manuel's reign were crewed by "native Romans", although use continued to be made of mercenaries and allied squadrons. However, the fact that the fleet was now exclusively built and based around Constantinople, and that provincial fleets were not reconstituted, did have its drawbacks, as outlying areas, in particular Greece, were left vulnerable to attack.

Nicaean navy
With the decline of the Byzantine fleet in the latter 12th century, the Empire increasingly relied on the fleets of Venice and Genoa. Following the sack of 1204 however, sources suggest the presence of a relatively strong fleet already under the first Nicaean emperor, Theodore I Laskaris, although specific details are lacking. Under John III and Theodore II, the navy had two main strategic areas of operations: the Aegean, entailing operations against the Greek islands (chiefly Rhodes) as well as the transport and supply of armies fighting in the Balkans, and the Sea of Marmara, where the Nicaeans aimed to interdict Latin shipping and threaten Constantinople. Smyrna provided the main shipyard and base for the Aegean, with a secondary one at Stadeia, while the main base for operations in the Marmara Sea was Holkos, near Lampsakos across the Gallipoli peninsula.

Palaiologan navy
Despite their efforts, the Nicaean emperors failed to successfully challenge the Venetian domination of the seas, and were forced to turn to the Genoese for aid. All these groups received small grants of land to cultivate in exchange for their service, and were settled together in small colonies. Throughout the Palaiologan period, the fleet's main base was the harbour of Kontoskalion on the Marmara shore of Constantinople, dredged and refortified by Michael VIII. Among the provincial naval centres, probably the most important was Monemvasia in the Peloponnese.

At the same time, Michael and his successors continued the well-established practice of using foreigners in the fleet. Alongside the mistrusted Italian city-states, with whom alliances shifted regularly, mercenaries were increasingly employed in the last centuries of the Empire, often rewarded for their services with fiefs. Most of these mercenaries, like Giovanni de lo Cavo (lord of Anafi and Rhodes), Andrea Morisco (successor of de lo Cavo in Rhodes) and Benedetto Zaccaria (lord of Chios and Phocaea), were Genoese, the Byzantines' major ally in the period. Under Michael VIII, for the first time a foreigner, the Italian privateer Licario, became  and was given Euboea as a fief. Only two holders are known, Ferran d'Aunés and Andrea Morisco, both from 1303 to 1305, although the rank continued to be mentioned in various lists of offices long after that. Pseudo-Kodinos also records that, while the other warships flew "the usual imperial flag" of the cross and the firesteels, the  flew an image of the emperor on horseback as his distinctive ensign.

Ships

Dromons and their derivatives

The primary warship of the Byzantine navy until the 12th century was the dromon and other similar ship types. Apparently an evolution of the light liburnian galleys of the imperial Roman fleets, the term first appears in the late 5th century, and was commonly used for a specific kind of war-galley by the 6th. During the next few centuries, as the naval struggle with the Arabs intensified, heavier versions with two or possibly even three banks of oars evolved. Eventually, the term was used in the general sense of 'warship', and was often used interchangeably with another Byzantine term for a large warship,  (from the Greek word , 'courser'), which first appeared during the 8th century.

Evolution and features
The appearance and evolution of medieval warships is a matter of debate and conjecture: until recently, no remains of an oared warship from either ancient or early medieval times had been found, and information had to be gathered by analyzing literary evidence, crude artistic depictions and the remains of a few merchant vessels. Only in 2005–2006 did archaeological digs for the Marmaray project in the location of the Harbour of Theodosius (modern Yenikapi) uncover the remains of over 36 Byzantine ships from the 6th to 10th centuries, including four light galleys of the  type.

The accepted view is that the main developments which differentiated the early dromons from the liburnians, and that henceforth characterized Mediterranean galleys, were the adoption of a full deck, the abandonment of the rams on the bow in favour of an above-water spur, and the gradual introduction of lateen sails. The exact reasons for the abandonment of the ram are unclear. Depictions of upward-pointing beaks in the 4th-century  manuscript may well illustrate that the ram had already been replaced by a spur in late antique galleys. One possibility is that the change occurred because of the gradual evolution of the ancient shell-first mortise and tenon hull construction method, against which rams had been designed, into the skeleton-first method, which produced a stronger and more flexible hull, less susceptible to ram attacks. Certainly by the early 7th century, the ram's original function had been forgotten, if we judge by Isidore of Seville's comments that they were used to protect against collision with underwater rocks. As for the lateen sail, various authors have in the past suggested that it was introduced into the Mediterranean by the Arabs, possibly with an ultimate origin in India. However, the discovery of new depictions and literary references in recent decades has led scholars to antedate the appearance of the lateen sail in the Levant to the late Hellenistic or early Roman period. Not only the triangular, but also the quadrilateral version were known, used for centuries (mostly on smaller craft) in parallel with square sails. Belisarius' invasion fleet of 533 was apparently at least partly fitted with lateen sails, making it probable that by the time the lateen had become the standard rig for the dromon, with the traditional square sail gradually falling from use in medieval navigation.

The dromons that Procopius describes were single-banked ships of probably 50 oars, arranged with 25 oars on each side. Again unlike Hellenistic vessels, which used an outrigger, these extended directly from the hull. In the later bireme dromons of the 9th and 10th centuries, the two oar banks were divided by the deck, with the first oar bank was situated below, whilst the second oar bank was situated above deck; these rowers were expected to fight alongside the marines in boarding operations. Makrypoulias suggests 25 oarsmen beneath and 35 on the deck on either side for a dromon of 120 rowers. The overall length of these ships was probably about 32 meters. Although most contemporary vessels had a single mast ( or ), the larger bireme dromons probably needed at least two masts in order to manoeuvre effectively, assuming that a single lateen sail for a ship this size would have reached unmanageable dimensions. The ship was steered by means of two quarter rudders at the stern, which also housed a tent that covered the captain's berth. The prow featured an elevated forecastle, below which the siphon for the discharge of Greek fire projected, although secondary siphons could also be carried amidships on either side. A pavesade, on which marines could hang their shields, ran around the sides of the ship, providing protection to the deck crew. Larger ships also had wooden castles on either side between the masts, similar to those attested for the Roman liburnians, providing archers with elevated firing platforms. The bow spur was intended to ride over an enemy ship's oars, breaking them and rendering it helpless against missile fire and boarding actions.

The four  ships uncovered in the Yenikapi excavations, dating to the 10th–11th centuries, are of uniform design and construction, suggesting a centralized manufacturing process. They have a length of  m, and are built of European Black Pine and Oriental plane.

Ship types

In the De Ceremoniis, the heavy  is said to have an even larger crew of 230 rowers and 70 marines; naval historian John H. Pryor considers them as supernumerary crews being carried aboard, while the Greek scholar Christos Makrypoulias suggests that the extra men correspond to a second rower on each of the upper-bank oars. The  in particular seems to have been strongly associated with the Mardaites, and Christos Makrypoulias even suggests that the ship was exclusively used by them. Three-banked ('trireme') dromons are described in a 9th-century work dedicated to the  Basil Lekapenos. However, this treatise, which survives only in fragments, draws heavily upon references on the appearance and construction of a Classical trireme, and must therefore be used with care when trying to apply it to the warships of the middle Byzantine period. The existence of trireme vessels is, however, attested in the Fatimid navy in the 11th and 12th centuries, and references made by Leo VI to large Arab ships in the 10th century may also indicate trireme galleys.

For cargo transport, the Byzantines usually commandeered ordinary merchantmen as transport ships or supply ships. These appear to have been mostly sailing vessels, rather than oared. The Byzantines and Arabs also employed horse-transports, which were either sailing ships or galleys, the latter certainly modified to accommodate the horses. The kind described in the De Ceremoniis had a single mast, four oars and a rudder. In the earlier years of the empire, shipbuilding wood for transport and supply ships was mainly from conifers, but in the later years  from broad-leaved trees, possibly from forests in what is now Turkey.

Western designs of the last centuries

The exact period when the dromon was superseded by -derived ships of Italian origin is uncertain. The term  continued in use until the late 12th century, although Byzantine writers were indiscriminate in their use of it. Contemporary Western writers used the term to denote large ships, usually transports, and there is evidence to support the idea that this usage had also spread to the Byzantines. William of Tyre's description of the Byzantine fleet in 1169, where "dromons" are classed as very large transports, and the warships with two oar banks are set apart from them, may thus indeed indicate the adoption of the new bireme galley types by the Byzantines. No construction differences are mentioned between the two, with both terms referring to horse-carrying vessels capable of carrying from 20 to 40 horses.

The bireme Italian-style galleys remained the mainstay of Mediterranean fleets until the late 13th century, although again, contemporary descriptions provide little detail on their construction. From that point on, the galleys universally became trireme ships, i.e. with three men on a single bank located above deck, each rowing a different oar; the so-called  system. The Venetians also developed the so-called "great galley", which was an enlarged galley capable of carrying more cargo for trade.

Little is known on particular Byzantine ships during the period. The accounts of the 1437 journey by sea of the Byzantine delegation to the Council of Florence, by the Byzantine cleric Sylvester Syropoulos and the Greek-Venetian captain Michael of Rhodes, mention that most of the ships were Venetian or Papal, but also record that Emperor John VIII travelled on an "imperial ship". It is unclear whether that ship was Byzantine or had been hired, and its type is not mentioned. It is, however, recorded as having been faster than the Venetian great merchant galleys accompanying it, possibly indicating that it was a light war galley. Michael of Rhodes also wrote a treatise on shipbuilding, which provided construction instructions and illustrations of the main vessels, both galleys and sailing ships, used by Venice and the other maritime states of the region in the first half of the 15th century.

Tactics and weapons
The Byzantines took care to codify, preserve and pass on the lessons of warfare at land and sea from past experience, through the use of military manuals. Despite their sometimes antiquarian terminology, these texts form the basis of our knowledge on Byzantine naval affairs. The main surviving texts are the chapters on sea combat in the Tactica of Leo the Wise and Nikephoros Ouranos (both drawing extensively from the Naumachiai of Syrianos Magistros and other earlier works), complemented by relevant passages in the De Administrando Imperio of Constantine Porphyrogennetos and other works by Byzantine and Arab writers.

Naval strategy, logistics and tactics
When examining ancient and medieval naval operations, it is necessary to first understand the technological limitations of galley fleets. Galleys did not handle well in rough waters and could be swamped by waves, which would be catastrophic in the open sea; history is replete with instances where galley fleets were sunk by bad weather (e.g. the Roman losses during the First Punic War). The sailing season was therefore usually restricted from mid-spring to September. The maintainable cruising speed of a galley, even when using sails, was limited, as were the amount of supplies it could carry. Water in particular, being essentially a galley's "fuel" supply, was of critical importance. There is no evidence that the navy operated dedicated supply ships to support the warships. With consumption levels estimated at 8 litres a day for every oarsman, its availability was a decisive operational factor in the often water-scarce and sun-baked coasts of the Eastern Mediterranean. Smaller dromons are estimated to have been able to carry about four days' worth of water. Effectively, this meant that fleets composed of galleys were confined to coastal routes, and had to make frequent landfall to replenish their supplies and rest their crews. This is well attested in Byzantine overseas endeavours, from Belisarius' campaign against the Vandals to the Cretan expeditions of the 9th and 10th centuries. It is for these reasons that Nikephoros Ouranos emphasizes the need to have available "men with accurate knowledge and experience of the sea [...], which winds cause it to swell and which blow from the land. They should know both the hidden rocks in the sea, and the places which have no depth, and the land along which one sails and the islands adjacent to it, the harbours and the distance such harbours are the one from the other. They should know both the countries and the water supplies."

Medieval Mediterranean naval warfare was therefore essentially coastal and amphibious in nature, carried out to seize coastal territory or islands, and not to exercise "sea control" as it is understood today. Furthermore, following the abandonment of the ram, the only truly "ship-killing" weapon available prior to the advent of gunpowder and explosive shells, sea combat became, in the words of John Pryor, "more unpredictable. No longer could any power hope to have such an advantage in weaponry or the skill of crews that success could be expected." It is no surprise therefore that the Byzantine and Arab manuals emphasize cautious tactics, with the priority given to the preservation of one's own fleet, and the acquisition of accurate intelligence, often through the use of spies posing as merchants. Emphasis was placed on achieving tactical surprise and, conversely, on avoiding being caught unprepared by the enemy. Ideally, battle was to be given only when assured of superiority by virtue of numbers or tactical disposition. Importance is also laid on matching one's forces and tactics to the prospective enemy: Leo VI, for instance, contrasted (Tactica, XIX.74–77) the Arabs with their heavy and slow ships, to the small and fast craft (chiefly monoxyla), of the Slavs and Rus'.

On campaign, following the assembly of the various squadrons at fortified bases along the coast, the fleet consisted of the main body, composed of the oared warships, and the baggage train of sailing vessels and oared transports, which would be sent away in the event of battle. The battle fleet was divided into squadrons, and orders were transmitted from ship to ship through signal flags and lanterns. The navy played key role in supplying land-based forces.

On the approach to and during an actual battle, a well-ordered formation was critical: if a fleet fell into disorder, its ships would be unable to lend support to each other and probably would be defeated. Fleets that failed to keep an ordered formation or that could not order themselves into an appropriate counter-formation to match that of the enemy, often avoided, or broke off from battle. Tactical manoeuvres were therefore intended to disrupt the enemy formation, including the use of various stratagems, such as dividing one's force and carrying out flanking manoeuvres, feigning retreat or hiding a reserve in ambush (Tactica, XIX.52–56). Indeed, Leo VI openly advised (Tactica, XIX.36) against direct confrontation and advocates the use of stratagems instead. According to Leo VI (Tactica, XIX.52), a crescent formation seems to have been the norm, with the flagship in the centre and the heavier ships at the horns of the formation, in order to turn the enemy's flanks. A range of variants and other tactics and counter-tactics was available, depending on the circumstances.

Once the fleets were close enough, exchanges of missiles began, ranging from combustible projectiles to arrows and javelins. The aim was not to sink ships, but to deplete the ranks of the enemy crews before the boarding actions, which decided the outcome. Once the enemy strength was judged to have been reduced sufficiently, the fleets closed in, the ships grappled each other, and the marines and upper bank oarsmen boarded the enemy vessel and engaged in hand-to-hand combat.

Armament

Unlike the warships of Antiquity, Byzantine and Arab ships did not feature rams, and the primary means of ship-to-ship combat were boarding actions and missile fire, as well as the use of inflammable materials such as Greek fire. Despite the fearsome reputation of the latter, it was only effective under certain circumstances, and not the decisive anti-ship weapon that the ram had been in the hands of experienced crews.

Like their Roman predecessors, Byzantine and Muslim ships were equipped with small catapults and ballistae that launched stones, arrows, javelins, pots of Greek fire or other incendiary liquids, caltrops and even containers full of lime to choke the enemy or, as Emperor Leo VI suggests, scorpions and snakes (Tactica, XIX.61–65). Marines and the upper-bank oarsmen were heavily armoured in preparation for battle (Leo referred to them as "cataphracts") and armed with close-combat arms such as lances and swords, while the other sailors wore padded felt jackets for protection and fought with bows and crossbows. The importance and volume of missile fire during sea combat can be gauged from the fleet manifests for the Cretan expeditions of the 10th century, which mention 10,000 caltrops, 50 bows and 10,000 arrows, 20 hand-carried  with 200 bolts , 'flies') and 100 javelins per dromon.

From the 12th century on, the crossbow (called ,  in Greek) became increasingly important in Mediterranean warfare, remaining the most deadly weapon available until the advent of fully rigged ships with gunpowder artillery. The Byzantines made infrequent use of the weapon, chiefly in sieges, although its use is recorded in some sea battles. Cannons were introduced in the latter half of the 14th century, but they were rarely used by the Byzantines, who only had a few artillery pieces for the defence of the land walls of Constantinople. Unlike the Venetians and Genoese, there is no indication that the Byzantines ever mounted any on ships.

Greek fire

"Greek fire" was the name given by Western Europeans to the flammable concoction used by the Byzantines, so called because the Europeans viewed the Byzantines as Greeks instead of Romans. The Byzantines themselves used various descriptive names for it, but the most common was 'liquid fire'. Although the use of incendiary chemicals by the Byzantines has been attested to since the early 6th century, the actual substance known as Greek fire is believed to have been created in 673 and is attributed to an engineer from Syria, named Kallinikos.  The most common method of deployment was to emit the formula through a large bronze tube onto enemy ships. Alternatively, it could be launched in jars fired from catapults; pivoting cranes are also mentioned as a method of pouring combustibles onto enemy ships. Usually the mixture would be stored in heated, pressurized barrels and projected through the tube by some sort of pump while the operators were sheltered behind large iron shields. A portable version also existed, reputedly invented by Leo VI, making it the direct analogue to a modern flamethrower. The means of its production was kept a state secret, and its components are only roughly guessed or described through secondary sources like Anna Komnene, so that its exact composition remains to this day unknown. In its effect, the Greek fire must have been rather similar to napalm. Contemporary sources make clear that it could not be extinguished by water, but rather floated and burned on top of it; sand could extinguish it by depriving it of oxygen, and several authors also mention strong vinegar and old urine as being able to extinguish it, presumably by some sort of chemical reaction. Consequently, felt or hides soaked in vinegar were used to provide protection against it.

Despite the somewhat exaggerated accounts of Byzantine writers, it was by no means a "wonder weapon", and did not avert some serious defeats. Given its limited range, and the need for a calm sea and favourable wind conditions, its usability was limited. Nevertheless, in favourable circumstances and against an unprepared enemy, its great destructive ability and psychological impact could prove decisive, as displayed repeatedly against the Rus'. Greek fire continued to be mentioned during the 12th century, but the Byzantines failed to use it against the Fourth Crusade, possibly because they had lost access to the areas (the Caucasus and the eastern coast of the Black Sea) where the primary ingredients were to be found. The Arabs fielded their own 'liquid fire' after 835, but it is unknown if they used the Byzantine formula, possibly obtained through espionage or through the defection of  Euphemios in 827, or whether they independently created a version of their own. A 12th-century treatise prepared by Mardi bin Ali al-Tarsusi for Saladin records a version of Greek fire, called  (naphtha), which had a petroleum base, with sulphur and various resins added.

Role of the navy in Byzantine history
It is not easy to assess the importance of the Byzantine navy to the Empire's history. On one hand, the Empire, throughout its life, had to defend a long coastline, often with little hinterland. In addition, shipping was always the quickest and cheapest way of transport, and the Empire's major urban and commercial centres, as well as most of its fertile areas, lay close to the sea. Coupled with the threat posed by the Arabs in the 7th to 10th centuries, this necessitated the maintenance of a strong fleet. The navy was perhaps at its most significant in the successful defence of Constantinople from the two Arab sieges, which ultimately saved the Empire. Throughout the period however, naval operations were an essential part of the Byzantine effort against the Arabs in a game of raids and counter-raids that continued up to the late 10th century.

On the other hand, the nature and limitations of the maritime technology of the age meant that the neither the Byzantines nor any of their opponents could develop a true thalassocracy. Galley fleets were confined to coastal operations, and were not able to play a truly independent role. Furthermore, as the alternation of Byzantine victories and defeats against the Arabs illustrates, no side was able to permanently gain the upper hand. Although the Byzantines pulled off a number of spectacular successes, such as Nasar's remarkable night-time victory in 880 (one of a handful of similar engagements in the Middle Ages), these victories were balanced off by similarly disastrous losses. Reports of mutinies by oarsmen in Byzantine fleets also reveal that conditions were often far from the ideal prescribed in the manuals. Combined with the traditional predominance of the great Anatolian land-holders in the higher military and civil offices, all this meant that, as in the Roman Empire, the navy, even at its height, was still regarded largely as an adjunct to the land forces. This fact is clearly illustrated by the relatively lowly positions its admirals held in the imperial hierarchy.

It is clear nevertheless that the gradual decline of the indigenous Byzantine naval power in the 10th and 11th centuries, when it was eclipsed by the Italian city-states, chiefly Venice and later Genoa, was of great long-term significance for the fate of the Empire. The sack of the Fourth Crusade, which shattered the foundations of the Byzantine state, was due in large part to the absolute defencelessness of the Empire at sea. This process was initiated by Byzantium itself in the 9th century, when the Italians were increasingly employed by the Empire to compensate for its own naval weakness in the West. The Italian republics also profited from their role as intermediaries in the trade between the Empire and Western Europe, marginalizing the Byzantine merchant marine, which in turn had adverse effects on the availability of Byzantine naval forces. Inevitably however, as the Italian republics slowly moved away from the Byzantine orbit, they began pursuing their own policies, and from the late 11th century on, they turned from protection of the Empire to exploitation and sometimes outright plunder, heralding the eventual financial and political subjugation of Byzantium to their interests. The absence of a strong navy was certainly keenly felt by the Byzantines at the time, as the comments of Kekaumenos illustrate. Strong and energetic emperors like Manuel Komnenos, and later Michael VIII Palaiologos, could revive Byzantine naval power, but even after landing heavy strokes against the Venetians, they merely replaced them with the Genoese and the Pisans. Trade thus remained in Latin hands, its profits continued to be siphoned off from the Empire, and after their deaths, their achievements quickly evaporated. After 1204, and with the brief exception of Michael VIII's reign, the fortunes of the now small Byzantine navy were more or less tied to the shifting alliances with the Italian maritime republics.

When viewing the entire course of Byzantine history, the waxing and waning of the navy's strength closely mirrors the fluctuation of the Empire's fortunes. It is this apparent interrelation that led the French Byzantinist Louis Bréhier to remark: "The epochs of [Byzantium's] dominion are those in which it held control of the sea, and it was when it lost it, that its reverses began."

See also

Notes

Bibliography

Further reading

 
 
 
 
 
 
 
 
 
 
 

 
Military history of the Mediterranean
Warfare of the Middle Ages
Naval warfare of the Middle Ages
Deforestation in Turkey